The Real World: Atlanta is the thirty-third and final season of MTV's reality television series The Real World, which focuses on a group of diverse strangers living together for several months in a different city each season as cameras document their lives and interpersonal relationships. This is the first season to be distributed through Facebook Watch via MTV Entertainment Studios and Bunim/Murray Productions. It premiered currently with two international localized versions: El Mundo Real in Mexico City and a version in Bangkok.

On May 20, 2019, it was announced that the season would premiere on June 13, 2019. Most episodes premiered at 9pm Eastern with some having live chats with the cast, excluding episodes 1 and 4 that premiered at noon Eastern.

Season changes
This is the first season since Season 28 to include the definite article The as part of the series's name, although it retains the new style of the logo introduced in Season 29. It is also the first since Season 28 to not have a twist for the season. The show's traditional opening sequence was brought back as well, with a modification to reflect the show now being streamed. Casting for this season was expanded to an age range of 21–34, leading to an older cast. It is the first season with two openly pansexual cast members.

Employment
Beginning in the 28th season, certain jobs in the area were approved by production that the cast had the liberty to apply for independently if desired. However, not all jobs make it into the episodes. Clint works at Big Sky Bar as a bartender.

Residence

The Real World was filmed at the Urban Oasis Bed and Breakfast in Atlanta, Georgia.

Cast

 Age at start of filming

Duration of Cast 

Notes

Episodes

After filming
Clint Wright was charged for domestic assault and arrested in Nashville on May 25, 2020. This is the only season of the show to not have any participant later compete on The Challenge.

References

External links
 Official site. Facebook.com

2019 American television seasons
Atlanta (2019)
Television shows set in Atlanta
Television shows filmed in Atlanta